St Michaels Cave is situated in the Sydney suburb of Avalon Beach. This sea-side cave is around 110 metres long, 15 metres high and 10 metres wide. The original colonial owner was a Reverend John Therry, who planned to deliver lectures within the cave and build a church above it. The cave was formed by the erosion of a jurassic dyke through triassic sedimentary rocks. The cave is known to be a breeding site for Common bent-wing bats and Large-eared pied bats.

See also
 Sydney Basin
 Newport Formation (NSW)
 Bald Hill Claystone
 Narrabeen group

References

Geology of New South Wales
Caves of New South Wales